John Evander Phillips House is a historic home located near Cameron, Moore County, North Carolina. It was built in 1893, and is a two-story, cruciform plan, frame farmhouse with Late Victorian style decorative elements.  The front facade features wraparound porch.  A breezeway at the rear of the dwelling, enclosed before 1937, joins the main block to a late 18th-century kitchen house.  Also on the property is a contributing brick cider house (c. 1893).

It was added to the National Register of Historic Places in 2000.

References

Houses on the National Register of Historic Places in North Carolina
Victorian architecture in North Carolina
Houses completed in 1893
Houses in Moore County, North Carolina
National Register of Historic Places in Moore County, North Carolina